Shiftgig was a platform that connected gig workers with employers through a mobile application to claim one-time and recurring jobs in real time.

Overview 
Shiftgig was conceived by entrepreneurs Eddie Lou, Jeff Pieta and Sean Casey.

Timeline and growth
Launched in Chicago in January 2012, Shiftgig has since expanded nationwide. In October 2012, Shiftgig raised $3 million in its Series A round of funding. In November 2014, Shiftgig raised $10 million from Garland Funds (of Huron Consulting Group) among other Chicago-based investors. In March 2015, Shiftgig expanded to Dallas, Texas, with plans of expanding to 3 to 5 more cities within the year.

On November 24, 2015, Shiftgig Inc. announced it had raised $22 million in Series B venture funding, led by Renren Inc., to expand its mobile marketplace.

In December 2017, Shiftgig was chosen as Innovator of the Year at the 2017 Dive Awards by HR Dive.

In April, 2019, Shiftgig's hospitality and national event staffing markets were acquired by LGC Hospitality and Headway Workforce Solutions. Following that transition, Shiftgig primarily operates as a SaaS company and its worker engagement platforms, Deploy and BookedOut, continue to operate with their staffing partners.

References

External links 

Online marketplaces of the United States
Companies based in Chicago
Privately held companies of the United States
Internet properties established in 2012
Freelance marketplace websites
Employment websites in the United States